Seek may refer to:

 Disk seek, in which the read head of a magnetic disk repositions itself
 Zero seek
 Rent seeking
 Job seeking
 Goal seeking
 Seek Limited, an Australian recruitment website
 Seek, a mobile app made by iNaturalist
 Seek: Reports from the Edges of America & Beyond
 Seeking.com
Seek, a entity from the Roblox game DOORS

See also
 Hide and Seek (disambiguation)
 Seek and Destroy (disambiguation)
 Sikh, an adherent of Sikhism
 fseek